Longsheng Various Nationalities (Gezu) Autonomous County (usually referred to as "Longsheng County" ) is a county in the northeast of Guangxi, China, bordering Hunan Province to the north. It is under the administration of Guilin City. The county has six towns and four townships under its jurisdiction, the county seat is the town of Longsheng.

Administrative divisions
As of 2020, Longsheng Various Nationalities Autonomous County has six towns and four townships under its jurisdiction. The county seat is Longsheng Town.

Geography
Longsheng Various Nationalities Autonomous County is located in northeastern Guangxi. Longsheng Various Nationalities Autonomous County shares a border with Rong'an County and Sanjiang Dong Autonomous County to the southwest, Tongdao Dong Autonomous County to the northwest, Xing'an County and Ziyuan County to the east, Chengbu Miao Autonomous County to the north, and Lingchuan County and Lingui District to the south.

Mountains

Rivers and Streams
There are over 480 rivers and streams in Longsheng Various Nationalities Autonomous County. Sang River is the largest river in the county.

Climate
Its record low temperature is  observed on January 30, 1977.

Demographics
By the end of 2019, there were 186,000 people lived in Longsheng Various Nationalities Autonomous County, among them, 150,300 are agricultural population and 127,600 are ethnic minorities.

Ethnic groups 
There are five nationalities in Longsheng Various Nationalities Autonomous County: the Miao, Yao, Dong, Zhuang and Han. According to 2010 census, the county is mostly populated by ethnic Dong (26.5%), with a sizeable population of ethnic Zhuang (22%), Yao (17%) and Miao (15%).

Dong people 
The Dong people of Longsheng County are largely concentrated in 23 villages throughout the county.

Miao people 
The Miao people of Longsheng County are largely concentrated in 13 villages throughout the county: Niutou, Zhangjia, Longjia, Lishi, Dongsheng, Yangwan, Furong, Bunong, Zhongdong, Limu, Conglin, Dawan, and Liangping.

Yao people
The Yao people of Longsheng County are largely concentrated in 13 villages throughout the county. In the eastern part, the Yao live in the villages of Zhonglu, Dazhai, Xiaozhai, Pannei, Ximen, Zhoujia, Jianxin, Lijiang, and Qinling. In the northern part, the Yao live in the villages of Liuli and Tongluo. In the southern part, the Yao live in the villages of Tonglie and Tandi.

The subgroups of the Yao people of Longsheng County include the Pan Yao,  (Younuo), and the Flowery Yao.

Zhuang people 
The Zhuang people of Longsheng County are largely concentrated in 17 villages in the western portion of the county: Longji, Ping'an, Jinjiang, Haijiang, Baishi, Daliu, Shuangdong, Jinjie, Pingye, Dayun, Jiaozhou, Liuman, Silong, Meidong, Menghua, Hongzhai, and Huaqiao.

Language
Mandarin is the official language. Local residents exclusively speak native languages at home.

Religion
The Miao, Yao, Dong and Zhuang people believe in animism and worship ancestors. Buddhism and Taoism are widespread religions of Han Chinese in Longsheng Various Nationalities Autonomous County.

Transport
The China National Highway 321, commonly referred to as "G321", is a southeast-northwest highway passing through the county's downtown, commercial, and industrial districts in the western part of Longsheng Various Nationalities Autonomous County.

The G65 Baotou–Maoming Expressway, more commonly known as "Bao-Mao Expressway", runs from the northwest to southeast of Longsheng Various Nationalities Autonomous County.

Tourism
Longsheng Various Nationalities Autonomous County is known worldwide for the Longsheng Rice Terraces. Major tourist destinations include Yulongtan Scenic Spot, Huaping National Nature Reserve, Baimian Yao Village, Longsheng Hot Spring, Weijiang Rice Terraces, and Xiabilin Waterfall. The county boasts many cultural and historical relics, including the Shunfeng Bridge (also known as "Red Army Bridge") and the Pan Village Wind-rain Bridge.

Gallery

References

Bibliography

County-level divisions of Guangxi
Kam autonomous counties
Yao autonomous counties
Miao autonomous counties
 
Administrative divisions of Guilin